The Basilica of the National Shrine of Our Lady of Coromoto is a minor Basilica and National Shrine dedicated in honor of Our Lady of Coromoto, patroness of Venezuela is 25 kilometers from the city of Guanare, Portuguesa, Venezuela. Today its pastor is the priest Allender Hernández.

The shrine is built on the site where the faithful believe the Virgin appeared to the Native American chief Coromoto.

The construction project was prepared in 1975 by exiled Spanish architect Juan Capdevila Elías and Venezuelan architect Erasmo Calvani, but it was not until early 1980 when work began.

The work was interrupted several times, so it was in February 1996 when it finally could be consecrated by Pope John Paul II, in the presence of more than two million devotees awaiting the consecration of the temple. On October 20, 2007, it was elevated by Pope Benedict XVI to the dignity of minor basilica.

See also
Basilica of the Holy Spirit, La Grita
Roman Catholicism in Venezuela
Our Lady of Coromoto

References

Our Lady of Coromoto
Buildings and structures in Portuguesa (state)
Roman Catholic churches completed in 1996
Roman Catholic shrines in Venezuela
20th-century Roman Catholic church buildings in Venezuela